Halimuraenoides is a monotypy genus of ray-finned fishes, classified under the subfamily Congrogadinae, the eel blennies, part of the dottyback family, Pseudochromidae. The single species in the genus, Halimuraenoides isostigma, is known only from the south-western tip of Madagascar.

References

Congrogadinae
Monotypic fish genera